Autódromo Oscar Cabalén is a  motorsports circuit located in Córdoba, Argentina. It has hosted events in the TC2000 and Formula Renault series. The circuit is named in honour of racing driver, Oscar Cabalén.

Events

 Current
 February: Turismo Nacional
 March: TCR South America Touring Car Championship
 April: Cordoba Pista
 May: Cordoba Pista
 August: Cordoba Pista
 November: Cordoba Pista

 Former
 F4 Argentina Championship (2021)
 Formula 3 Sudamericana (1998, 2004–2005, 2007)
 Formula 4 Sudamericana (2015)
 Fórmula Truck (2012–2014)
 Porsche GT3 Cup Trophy Argentina (2018)
 South American Super Touring Car Championship (1999)
 TC2000 Championship (1980–1982, 1984–1985, 1987, 1989–1992, 1998–2005, 2007–2022)
 Top Race V6 (1999–2000, 2003, 2011, 2013, 2015, 2018–2019)
 Turismo Carretera (1968, 1970, 1977, 1988, 2014)

Lap records 

As of July 2022, the fastest official race lap records at the Autódromo Oscar Cabalén are listed as:

References

External links 
Official site (Spanish only)

Motorsport venues in Córdoba Province, Argentina